Michael Pitts (born December 31, 1955) is an American politician, judge, and law enforcement officer. From 2003 to 2019, he served as a member of the South Carolina House of Representatives from the 14th District. He is a member of the Republican Party.

In 2019, Pitts was nominated to lead the state Conservation Bank, though he withdrew his nomination. Later that year, Pitts was successfully nominated to be a magistrate judge for Laurens County, South Carolina.

Pitts is married to Susan W. Slay, and they have three children. He graduated from Lander University in 1985.

References

External links 

Living people
1955 births
Republican Party members of the South Carolina House of Representatives
21st-century American politicians
People from Greenwood, South Carolina
21st-century American judges
County judges in the United States